Robb Denovan (aliases: R. Deadly, Ron Donovan, Robbo Choyan etc.) is an animator from Canada who has won international acclaim for his work. He currently lives in London, England.

Robb was born to Jack and Janet Denovan on June 1, 1978, in Carleton Place, Ontario. He attended St. Mary's Public School and Carleton Place High School.

Robb studied at Sheridan College in Oakville, Ontario, from 1997 to 2001, and got his first big break as an animator in 2004, when he worked on the Oscar-winning National Film Board of Canada short film Ryan. He later worked on The Wild, a project for Disney. His next big project took him to New Zealand, where he worked under Peter Jackson on the award-winning film King Kong. 

Currently, Robb works as an animator for Pixar and his work can be seen in Cars 2, Brave and Monsters University.

Robb has also engaged in, and done popular art for, such social groups as Gentlemen's Club and Medical Architects.

Filmography
Animation department
 Finding Dory (directing animator) - 2016
 Inside Out (animator) -2015
 Monsters University (animator) - 2013
 Brave (animator) - 2012
 Cars 2 (animator) - 2011
 La Luna (animator) - 2011
 The Wolfman (animator) - 2010
 Harry Potter and the Half-Blood Prince (animator - uncredited) - 2009
 10,000 BC (lead animator) - 2008
 The Chronicles of Narnia: Prince Caspian (lead animator) - 2008
 Surly Squirrel (Short) (animator - as Rob Denovan) - 2005
 Ryan (Documentary short) (animator) - 2004
Visual effects
 Clash of the Titans (lead animator: MPC) - 2010
 10,000 BC (animator: MPC) - 2008
 The Wild (animator) - 2006
 King Kong (animator) - 2005

References

External links 

1978 births
Canadian animators
Living people
People from Carleton Place
Sheridan College animation program alumni
Pixar people